In enzymology, a glutathione oxidase is an enzyme that catalyzes the chemical reaction

2 glutathione + O2  glutathione disulfide + H2O2

Thus, the two substrates of this enzyme are glutathione and O2, whereas its two products are glutathione disulfide and H2O2.

This enzyme belongs to the family of oxidoreductases, specifically those acting on a sulfur group of donors with oxygen as acceptor.  The systematic name of this enzyme class is glutathione:oxygen oxidoreductase. This enzyme participates in glutathione metabolism.  It employs one cofactor, FAD.

References

 

EC 1.8.3
Flavoproteins
Enzymes of unknown structure